Francisco Marcelo Vega Cepeda (Inca de Oro, Chile, August 12, 1971) is a former Chilean footballer and sports commentator, who played as a midfielder and is recognized for being one of the best creative midfielder in Chilean football.

Club career
Marcelo Vega began his football career defending Regional Atacama, aged 14. At 16 he was a top scorer in the second division. Then he was transferred to Unión Española, in 1991, a club with which he made his debut in the First Division and under the technical direction of Nelson Acosta he had his best performances, thanks to Marcelo they became champions of the Chile Cup for two consecutive years, in 1992 and 1993 Marcelo Vega also holds the record of winning 3 consecutive Chile Cups, 2 with Unión Española and 1 with Colo Colo.

Nicknamed "Guatón" or "Tobi", due to his resemblance to the character of the homonymous children's comic (Toby and his friends), and the Chilean Maradona for his similarity in football on the field, Vega also played in Colo-Colo, Santiago Wanderers, Logroñés from Spain, MetroStars from the United States and Racing Club in Argentina, he also played at Cienciano from Peru, in addition to another stint at Regional Atacama and Unión Española. His last campaigns as a professional were played at the University of Chile.

Selected Chilean since 1986, he participated in the South American sub 16 in Peru, leaving in the FIFA ideal team together with Marco Antonio Etcheverry and other figures of that South American, he also played in the 1991 Copa América in Chile and in the 1993 Copa América in Ecuador. In addition, he was in the Chilean squad that traveled to the 1998 World Cup in France, where he played only half time against Brazil, in fact the Chilean discount from Marcelo Salas was after a pass from Vega and later pivoting from Iván Zamorano, but he did not have a greater performance due to which he reached the World Cup injured. He played 30 times for the Chile National Team between 1991 and 1998, scoring 1 goal.

He was the biggest assistant in the qualifiers for the World Cup in France 98.

International career
Vega represented Chile at under-16 level in the 1986 South American Championship

He was capped 30 times and scored 1 goal for the Chile national team between 1991 and 1998. At the 1998 FIFA World Cup he played 45 minutes in the round of 16 match versus Brazil.

Personal life
He is a panelist in the program Todos Somos Técnicos (We Are All Technicians) from TNT Sports (former CDF), in which he stands out for evaluating Chilean soccer players and for his great sense of humor.     

In 2009, he participated in the Chilean reality show called 1810, but was eliminated.

References

External links
 

1971 births
Living people
People from Copiapó
Chilean footballers
Chilean expatriate footballers
Chile international footballers
Chile youth international footballers
1998 FIFA World Cup players
1991 Copa América players
1993 Copa América players
Regional Atacama footballers
Unión Española footballers
CD Logroñés footballers
Colo-Colo footballers
Santiago Wanderers footballers
New York Red Bulls players
San Jose Earthquakes players
Racing Club de Avellaneda footballers
Cienciano footballers
Universidad de Chile footballers
Primera B de Chile players
Chilean Primera División players
La Liga players
Major League Soccer players
Argentine Primera División players
Peruvian Primera División players
Chilean expatriate sportspeople in Spain
Chilean expatriate sportspeople in the United States
Chilean expatriate sportspeople in Argentina
Chilean expatriate sportspeople in Peru
Expatriate footballers in Spain
Expatriate soccer players in the United States
Expatriate footballers in Argentina
Expatriate footballers in Peru
Association football midfielders
Reality television participants
Chilean association football commentators
Canal del Fútbol color commentators
TNT Sports Chile color commentators